Gertrude Maud Barnes (25 March 1903 – 27 July 1998), known professionally as Binnie Barnes, was an English actress whose career in films spanned  from 1923 to 1973.

Early life 
Barnes was born in Islington, London, the daughter of Rosa Enoyce and George Barnes, a policeman;  16 children were in her family. Before moving to Hollywood to become an actress, Barnes worked a series of jobs, such as chorus girl, nurse, and dance hostess.

Career 

Barnes began her acting career in films in 1923, appearing in a short film made by Lee De Forest in his Phonofilm sound-on-film process. Her film career continued in Great Britain, most notably in The Private Life of Henry VIII (1933) as Katherine Howard, Henry's fifth wife. Barnes' main qualm in accepting roles as an actress was that she not play submissive roles. Barnes once remarked, "One picture is just like another to me, as long as I don't have to be a sweet woman". Later, her career continued in Hollywood, until 1973, when she appeared in the comedy 40 Carats, her last acting role.

Personal life 
Barnes's first husband was London art dealer Samuel Joseph. Her second marriage was to film producer Mike Frankovich, and later she was  a naturalised United States citizen. The couple adopted three children.

Binnie Barnes died on 27 July 1998 of natural causes, aged 95, in Beverly Hills. She was interred in Forest Lawn Memorial Park, Glendale.

Hollywood Walk of Fame 
For her contributions to the film industry, Barnes received a motion pictures star on the Hollywood Walk of Fame in 1960. Her star is located at 1501 Vine Street.

Complete filmography 

 Phonofilm (1923)
 A Night in Montmartre (1931) – Therese
 Love Lies (1931) – Junetta
 Doctor Josser K.C. (1931) – Rosa Wopp
 Murder at Covent Garden (1932) – Girl
 The Innocents of Chicago (1932) – Peg Guinan
 Partners Please (1932 short) – Billie
 Strip! Strip! Hooray!!! (1932 short) – Spanish Lady
 Down Our Street (1932) – Tessie Bernstein
 The Last Coupon (1932) – Mrs. Meredith
 Old Spanish Customers (1932) – Carmen
 Taxi to Paradise (1933 short) – Joan Melhuish
 Counsel's Opinion (1933) – Leslie
 Heads We Go (1933) – Lil Pickering
 The Private Life of Henry VIII (1933) – Katherine Howard – The Fifth Wife
 The Silver Spoon (1933) – Lady Perivale
 Their Night Out (1933) – Lola
 Nine Forty-Five (1934) – Ruth Jordan
 No Escape (1934) – Myra Fengler
 The Lady Is Willing (1934) – Helene Dupont
 One Exciting Adventure (1934) – Rena Sorel
 Gift of Gab (1934) – Maid
 The Private Life of Don Juan (1934) – Rosita, a Maid Pure and Simple
 Forbidden Territory (1934) – Valerie Petrovna
 There's Always Tomorrow (1934) – Alice Vail
 Diamond Jim (1935) – Lillian Russell
 Rendezvous (1935) – Olivia Kerloff
 La Fiesta de Santa Barbara (1935, Short) – Herself
 Sutter's Gold (1936) – Countess Elizabeth Bartoffski
 Small Town Girl (1936) – Priscilla Hyde
 The Last of the Mohicans (1936) – Alice Munro
 The Magnificent Brute (1936) – Della Lane
 Three Smart Girls (1936) – Donna Lyons
 Breezing Home (1937) – Henrietta Fairfax
 Broadway Melody of 1938 (1937) – Caroline Whipple
 Out of the Blue (1937) – Rosa
 The Divorce of Lady X (1938) – Lady Mere
 The First Hundred Years (1938) – Claudia Weston
 The Adventures of Marco Polo (1938) – Nazama
 Holiday (1938) – Mrs. Laura Cram
 Three Blind Mice (1938) – Miriam Harrington
 Always Goodbye (1938) – Harriet Martin
 Tropic Holiday (1938) – Marilyn Joyce
 Gateway (1938) – Mrs. Fay Sims
 Thanks for Everything (1938) – Kay Swift
 The Three Musketeers (1939) – Milady De Winter
 Wife, Husband and Friend (1939) – Cecil Carver
 Man About Town (1939) – Lady Arlington
 Frontier Marshal (1939) – Jerry
 Day-Time Wife (1939) – Blanche
 'Til We Meet Again (1940) – Comtesse de Bresac
 This Thing Called Love (1940) – Charlotte Campbell
 Angels with Broken Wings (1941) – Sybil Barton
 Tight Shoes  (1941) – Sybil Ash
 The Great Awakening (1941, aka New Wine) – Countess Marie Duvarre
 Three Girls About Town (1941) – Faith Banner
 Skylark (1941) – Myrtle Vantine
 Call Out the Marines (1942) – Violet 'Vi' Hall
 In Old California (1942) – Lacey Miller
 I Married an Angel (1942) – Peggy
 The Man from Down Under (1943) – Aggie Dawlins
 Up in Mabel's Room (1944) – Alicia Larchmont
 The Hour Before the Dawn (1944) – May Heatherton
 Barbary Coast Gent (1944) – Lil Damish
 It's in the Bag! (1945) – Eve Floogle
 The Spanish Main (1945) – Anne Bonney
 Getting Gertie's Garter (1945) – Barbara
 The Time of Their Lives (1946) – Mildred Dean
 If Winter Comes (1947) – Natalie Bagshaw
 The Dude Goes West (1948) – Kiki Kelly
 My Own True Love (1948) – Geraldine
 The Pirates of Capri (1949, aka The Masked Pirate) – Queen Maria Carolina
 Fugitive Lady (1950) – Esther Clementi
 Shadow of the Eagle (1950) – Catherine, Empress of Russia
 Decameron Nights (1953) – Contessa di Firenze / Nerina the Chambermaid / The Old Witch
 Malaga (1954) – Frisco
 The Trouble with Angels (1966) – Sister Celestine
 Where Angels Go, Trouble Follows (1968) – Sister Celestine
 40 Carats (1973) – Maud Ericson

References

External links 

 
 
 Photographs and literature

1903 births
1998 deaths
20th-century American actresses
Actresses from London
American film actresses
American television actresses
Burials at Forest Lawn Memorial Park (Glendale)
English film actresses
British emigrants to the United States
English television actresses
People from Islington (district)
20th-century English actresses
20th-century British businesspeople